Sonoita is a monotypic genus of jumping spiders containing the single species, Sonoita lightfooti. It was first described by George and Elizabeth Peckham in 1903, and is found only in Africa.

References

External links
 Diagnostic drawings

Salticidae
Spiders described in 1903
Spiders of Africa